Qari Salahuddin Ayubi is an Afghan Taliban politician and military personal who is currently serving as Deputy Minister of Planning and Policy of the Ministry of Rural Rehabilitation and Development since 4 March 2022.

References

Living people
Taliban commanders
Taliban government ministers of Afghanistan
People from Faryab Province
Year of birth missing (living people)